Mark Wiens is an American politician serving in the Minnesota House of Representatives since 2023. A member of the Republican Party of Minnesota, Wiens represents District 41A in the eastern Twin Cities metropolitan area, which includes the cities of Cottage Grove and Lake Elmo and parts of Washington County, Minnesota.

Early life, education and career 
Wiens received his bachelor's degree in history from the University of Minnesota. He attended the United States Army Command and General Staff College School of Military Studies and earned a master of military art and science (MMAS) in theater operations. Wiens served in the United States Army for 30 years, followed by the Minnesota National Guard.

Minnesota House of Representatives 
Wiens was first elected to the Minnesota House of Representatives in 2022, following redistricting and the retirement of Republican incumbents Keith Franke and Tony Jurgens. Wiens serves on the Judiciary Finance and Civil Law, Veterans and Military Affairs Finance and Policy, and Workforce Development Finance and Policy Committees.

Electoral history

Personal life 
Wiens lives in Lake Elmo, Minnesota with his wife, Tina, and their two children.

References

External links 

Republican Party members of the Minnesota House of Representatives
Year of birth missing (living people)
Living people
People from Lake Elmo, Minnesota
University of Minnesota alumni
United States Army Command and General Staff College alumni
United States Army personnel
Minnesota National Guard personnel